Hammer Heads is an action arcade game similar to Whac-A-Mole. It is developed by Nuclide Games and distributed by PopCap Games.

Gameplay
The objective of the game is to smash the gnomes coming from the holes in the game area. The player controls a hammer with the mouse, and clicking on the gnomes reduces their hearts, displayed on the bottom of the gnome, depending on the power of the hammer. The default hammer takes away one heart, but more powerful hammers can be bought at the shop. There are various gnomes in the game, with a different amount of health and characteristics. Care must be taken to avoid clicking on traps, such as bombs. The player starts with five hearts, which is reduced when a click misses, a gnome escapes, or a trap is activated. They can be recovered by clicking on the hearts dropped by gnomes, or purchasing them from the shop. If the player hits the item (such as a snake or roller skates) on the background, 500 points will be awarded. The maximum amount of hearts can be raised by making a purchase at the shop as well. If all of the hearts run out, the game is over.

Starting on level five (six in the Deluxe version), the shop begins popping up from holes. If clicked, the player is taken to a new screen where they can buy several things, such as hammers, hearts, and other power-ups. Coins are used to purchase items from the shop. There are various way to obtain coins, such as picking them up when left behind by gnomes, completing a bonus round, or defeating certain gnomes and/or in a certain manner.

Deluxe version
The deluxe version of Hammer Heads includes a checkpoint system for the regular classic mode. If the player loses all hearts, he/she may continue from a certain level. A new checkpoint is available every five levels. If the player quits the game, the game suspends progress, and the player can continue exactly where he/she started. Hammer Heads Deluxe also includes a marathon mode, which is similar to classic mode, however, the player is given no checkpoints and the game can last indefinitely. Hammer Heads Deluxe has a trophy system similar to Chuzzle Deluxe. When a certain objective is met, a trophy is received and added to the trophy room, where the player can check the trophies earned, as well as find out how to earn the rest. There is also a boss enemy called "King Globus" at the end with 3000 hit points. Defeating the boss unlocks the "Tough Cookie" option, a higher difficulty setting.

PopCap offers a free online version at their site. It is more limited than the deluxe version, which can be downloaded as a free trial for one hour. After the hour has passed, the player must purchase the game.

External links
Nuclide Games

2006 video games
Action video games
Browser games
PopCap games
Video games developed in Belgium
Windows games
Single-player video games